Mudaifi is a suburb of the town of Khor Fakkan in Sharjah, United Arab Emirates (UAE).

Populated places in the Emirate of Sharjah